Cerynea porphyrea is a species of moth in the family Erebidae. It is found in Madagascar.

References 

Boletobiinae
Moths of Madagascar
Moths of Africa